I Love a Piano is an album by American jazz pianist Phineas Newborn Jr. recorded in 1959 and released on the Roulette label.

Reception
The Allmusic site awarded the album 4½ stars.

Track listing
 "Take the "A" Train" (Billy Strayhorn) – 2:41
 "Gee, Baby, Ain't I Good to You" (Andy Razaf, Don Redman) – 3:04
 "Ain't Misbehavin'" (Fats Waller, Harry Brooks, Razaf) – 3:55
 "I've Got the World on a String" (Harold Arlen, Ted Koehler) – 3:27
 "The Midnight Sun Will Never Set" (Dorcas Cochran, Quincy Jones, Henri Salvador) – 4:03
 "Real Gone Guy"  (Nellie Lutcher) – 2:12
 "Undecided" (Sid Robin, Charlie Shavers) – 3:40
 "Ivy League Blues" (Phineas Newborn Jr.)  – 3:46
 "Love and Marriage" (Sammy Cahn, Jimmy Van Heusen) – 4:01
 "Give Me the Simple Life" (Rube Bloom, Harry Ruby) – 4:12

Personnel
Phineas Newborn Jr. – piano
John Simmons – bass
Roy Haynes – drums

References

Roulette Records albums
Phineas Newborn Jr. albums
1960 albums
Albums produced by Teddy Reig